Liu Yue is the name of:

Liu Yue (footballer, born 1975), Chinese international footballer
Liu Yue (footballer, born 1997), Chinese footballer